Mikhail Alexeyevich Rakhmanov (born May 27, 1992) is a Kazakhstani professional ice hockey winger who currently plays for Barys Astana of the Kontinental Hockey League (KHL).

Career statistics

Regular season

International

References

External links

1992 births
Living people
Sportspeople from Oskemen
Barys Nur-Sultan players
Snezhnye Barsy players
Kazakhstani ice hockey right wingers
Universiade silver medalists for Kazakhstan
Universiade medalists in ice hockey
Competitors at the 2017 Winter Universiade